Saphanini is a tribe of beetles in the subfamily Spondylidinae.

Genera
Blabinotus Wollaston, 1854
Derolophodes Brancsik, 1898
Drymochares Mulsant, 1847
Masatopes Breuning & Villiers, 1959
Metalocerus Aurivillius, 1913
Michthisoma LeConte, 1850
Opsamates Waterhouse, 1879
Oxypleurus Mulsant, 1839
Saphanus Audinet-Serville, 1834
Zamium Pascoe, 1864

References

Spondylidinae
Taxa named by Johannes von Nepomuk Franz Xaver Gistel